Onaayum Aattukkuttiyum is a 2013 Indian Tamil-language neo-noir thriller film written, directed and produced by Mysskin. Sri of Vazhakku Enn 18/9 fame, Mysskin, and Shaji Chen play the lead roles in the film. The film score was composed by Ilaiyaraaja. The film had no heroine and no songs. Filming began on 11 March 2013 and the crew shot the entire film in and around Chennai city. Onaayum Aattukkuttiyum released on 27 September 2013 and got universal acclaim. This film acquired cult status in Tamil cinema and inspired similar themes.

Plot 

A man with a gunshot wound collapses on the side of a road, where passers-by notice him but avoid taking any action. Chandru, a medical student, comes across the bleeding man and tries to get him medical help, but to no avail. Finally, he takes the stranger to his house and performs a surgery to save his life. This act comes to haunt him as the man, known as Wolf, actually had escaped police that night. Chandru’s entire family is taken into police custody for aiding and abetting a criminal.

Meanwhile, at the police station, a police officer is seen giving information about Wolf’s whereabouts to Thamba, another criminal. Thamba wants to kill Wolf and his family. Chandru receives a phone call from Wolf, who wants to meet him at a train station. The police give Chandru a gun and ask him to kill Wolf, as they know Wolf will flee if he sees police nearby. However, Wolf kidnaps Chandru on a hijacked train. They go to a temple, where Wolf meets a blind woman. While waiting near a building, Chandru attacks Wolf with a rock and subdues him. As Chandru goes to call the police, Wolf escapes with the woman.

Chandru follows Wolf and sees him meeting another woman and a little girl who is also blind. Confronting Wolf again, Chandru threatens to shoot the girl and forces, Wolf, to the ground. They’re, however, kidnapped by Thamba’s men in a van. Wolf and Chandru gain control of the van after Wolf pushes out one of Thamba’s men. They go to Calvary Cemetery, where another blind man awaits. All of them are actually there to light candles in a memorial for the blind man and woman’s son, who was inadvertently killed by Wolf while working for Thamba. Since then, Wolf had been taking care of the family, and they, in turn, treat him like their own son. Wolf had also stopped working for Thamba, hence why Thamba wants to kill him. Just then, the police and one of Thamba’s men attack them and kill the blind man and another lady.

Wolf carries the blind woman and little girl to a basement car park, where someone supposes to fetch them. However, Thamba’s men ambush and kill the woman while Wolf was protecting the little girl. Chandru, realising Wolf is not evil as depicted by the police, rushes to help Wolf kill Thamba’s men. Wolf, convinced that Chandru would take care of the girl, shoots himself in the stomach and surrenders to the police. The movie ends with Chandru walking away from a scene carrying the girl.

Cast

 Sri as Chandru
 Mysskin as Wolf / Edward
 Shaji Chen as CBCID Lal
 Adithya as Yuva
 Raj Bharath as Thamba
 Neelima Rani as Chandru's sister-in-law
 Baby Chaitanya as Karthi
 Shaukat as Karthi's father
 Mona as Priscilla
 Sreeram as Isac
 Angel Glady as Bharati/Forest fairy
 Supergood Subramani as Police officer
 Gajaraj as Police officer
 Ravi Venkatraman

Production
On 16 February 2013 Mysskin announced his new production company Lone Wolf Productions and two days later newspaper ads came out with the title of his new film, Onaayum Aattukkuttiyum, and its design. The film was started with a pooja launch at the producer and directors office  where only his close associates were present. Young actor Sri of Vazhakku Enn 18/9 fame was roped in to do the lead.

The shooting happened in and around Chennai. Most of the shooting was happening at night because the story is set against the backdrop of darkness.

In June 2013, a trailer of Onaiyum Aatukuttiyum was released on YouTube, Though Ilaiyaraaja was signed as the composer, the trailer had Austrian composer Gustav Mahler's Symphony No. 5.

Music
Ilaiyaraaja composed the film score. The film did not have any songs and Ilaiyaraaja after two decades composed the BGM only for a film. Instrumental pieces from the score were released before the film's release. Mysskin released the background score for free to download in his production website as a tribute to Ilaiyaraaja.

Release
The satellite rights of the film were secured by STAR Vijay. The film was given a "U/A" certificate by the Indian Censor Board

Reception
Onaayum Aattukkuttiyum opened to rave reviews. 
Sudhish Kamath wrote, "Mysskin has once again proved that he’s one of the most exciting, even if inconsistent, filmmakers of our times. The actor-director is in sparkling form as he returns with a career-best in this dark, gritty, moody, philosophical metaphor-infested chase film that’s mostly brilliant. Onaayum Aattukkuttiyum compares well with world cinema but with a little more restraint and understatement, Mysskin has every potential to breakout at the international festival circuit and make us proud someday". Sify wrote "Onayum Aatukuttiyum is a gripping edge of the seat emotional dark thriller which also entertains. Onayum Aatukuttiyum is a stylishly made thriller and a class act. Haricharan Pudipeddi of IANS gave 4 stars out of 5 and wrote "OA arrives sans fanfare, but it sweeps you off your feet with an engrossing narrative, told mostly through one night. OA is a cut above Mysskin`s previous works. He crushes all cinematic cliches with this effort and manages to gives us a film we deserve". The Times of India gave 3.5 stars out of 5 and wrote "on the whole, Onaiyum Aatukuttiyum, while a rung below Anjathey in the filmography of Mysskin, is a tense thriller, one of the interesting films of the year, that is yet another showcase for its maker".

Rediff too gave 3.5 stars out of 5 and wrote, "Mysskin has scripted a brilliant tale filled with human emotions and dark humour, cleverly maintaining the suspense element in the film until the very end". 
The New Indian Express wrote, "Mysskin’s wolf and the lamb saga is refreshing, exciting and offers a different viewing experience to Tamil audience". Behindwoods gave 3.5 out of 5 and wrote "Mysskin’s Onaayum Aattukuttiyum is marked by apt performances, engaging screen play, intelligent narration and a sincere execution accompanied by technical flashes of brilliance. 
Indiaglitz have 3.25 out of 5 and wrote, "OA has every desirable aspect of Myskin's previous thrillers viz. nail-biting narration, neat performances, riveting re-recording, natural lights and as an addition to these there is no songs spoiling the narration in the movie".

Sudish Kamath later picked it as one of five films that have redefined Tamil cinema, writing, "Mysskin hits peak form as a storyteller with the most evolved sense of visual grammar in this part of the world". It was also featured in the year-end top Tamil films lists of Sify and Rediff.

Box office
The film good opening at the box office and collected  2  crore rupees in 3 days. The film ran for more than 5 weeks in many movie halls.

The film was premiered on television on Diwali day (2 November 2013), while the film was still running successfully in theaters.

Legacy
The movie has achieved cult status among audiences. Even though it performed well at the box-office it didn't get the recognition at first, it is now widely accepted as one of the best Tamil films of the 2010s decade.

References

External links
 

2013 films
2013 action thriller films
2013 crime thriller films
2010s chase films
Films scored by Ilaiyaraaja
Indian action thriller films
Indian crime thriller films
Indian chase films
Films directed by Mysskin
Films set in Chennai
Films shot in Chennai
Fictional portrayals of the Tamil Nadu Police
Films about blind people in India